2nd Minnesota Light Artillery Battery was a Minnesota USV  artillery battery that served in the Union Army during the American Civil War.

The battery was mustered in at Fort Snelling, Minnesota, on  March 21, 1862.

The 2nd Minnesota Light Artillery Battery was mustered out at St. Paul, Minnesota, on August 16, 1865.

Commander
Captain William A. Hotchkiss - February 14, 1862, to August 16, 1865

Casualties and total strength
The 2nd Minnesota Light Artillery Battery lost 1 officer and 5 enlisted men killed in action or died of wounds received in battle and 19 enlisted men died of disease. Total fatalities were 
25.

References

External links
The Civil War Archive Website
 Minnesota Historical Society page on Minnesota and the Civil War

See also
List of Minnesota Civil War Units

Units and formations of the Union Army from Minnesota
Artillery units and formations of the American Civil War
1862 establishments in Minnesota
Military units and formations established in 1862
Military units and formations disestablished in 1865